Summer Whispers is a 2008 South Korean romance film starring Lee Young-eun and Ha Seok-jin. It is written and directed by first-time director Kim Eun-joo. Lee was nominated Best New Actress at the 46th Grand Bell Awards in 2009.

Plot
Professor Noh decides to visit his son in America after losing his wife. He asks his student (Young-jo) and a young man (Yoon-soo) from the flower shop to take care of his house. Young-jo arranges his books in the morning, while Yoon-soo tends to the garden in the afternoon. Although they do not meet, they come to know each other through the traces each left in the house and through the Professor's cat whom Young-jo is allergic to.

Cast
 Lee Young-eun as Young-jo
 Ha Seok-jin as Yoon-soo
 Choi Jong-won as Professor Noh
 Woo Sang-min as Professor Noh's wife
 Jung Woo as Jung-sik
 Choi Yoon-jung as Shin-hee
 Kim Hyung-beom as movie director
 Gu Bon-im as Kyung-sook 
 Shin Cheol-jin as supermarket owner

References

External links 
 
 
 

2008 films
2000s Korean-language films
South Korean romantic drama films
2000s South Korean films